Masisi is a town in the Democratic Republic of the Congo.

Masisi may also refer to:

Mokgweetsi Masisi, the fifth and current president of Botswana
Edison Masisi, a diplomat and politician from Botswana and the father of Mokgweetsi Masisi
Neo Masisi, the First Lady of Botswana and wife of Mokgweetsi Masisi
Love Masisi, Dutch drag queen
Masisi Territory, a territory around Masisi in the Democratic Republic of the Congo